Fellows is a ghost town in the town of Center, Rock County, Wisconsin, United States.

History
A post office called Fellows was established in 1887, and remained in operation until it was discontinued in 1902. The community was named for a local land owner.

Notes

Geography of Rock County, Wisconsin
Ghost towns in Wisconsin